Patricia Pérez (Vigo, Spain, December 5, 1973) is a Spanish actress, presenter and writer. She became known in Spain, the United States and throughout Latin America for co-hosting the 1993 hit game show El Gran Juego de la Oca with Emilio Aragón and Lydia Bosch.

Biography 
She began her career at TVG presenting the program Luar with Xosé Ramón Gayoso in September 1992. The following year (1993), she was hired by Antena 3 to co-host the program El Gran Juego de la Oca, whose enormous success in many countries where it was broadcast brought her fame and recognition.

In 1995, she moved to Argentina for two and a half years. In this country, she shot a film and collaborated on several television programs.

On her return to Spain, she worked for Telecinco in the space Emisión imposible, and a year later she signed on with the regional channel Telemadrid, where she hosted, along with journalist Victor Sandoval, the social news program Mamma mía, which remained on screen until June 2004. She then worked again for Antena 3, in programs such as A la carta and El Supershow. She returned to the Madrid regional channel in 2006 to co-host the contest Metro a Metro (2006-2008) and the hidden camera show Bromas aparte (2006-2009).

In the 2000s, specifically since 2003, she combined her appearances on Telemadrid and Antena 3 with the presentation of the contest Memoria de Elefante on Castilla-La Mancha Televisión and continued on both regional channels for five years.

In 2009, she returned to national television, specifically to Telecinco, aking over the reins of the program Vuélveme loca with Celia Montalbán and later with Tania Llasera after Celia's departure. She remained at the helm of the program for two years, until December 28, 2011, when she was replaced by Jaime Bores.

In 2017, she debuted on laSexta's weekend mornings with her husband, Luis Canut, in the program Los Hygge.

Patricia specialized in orthomolecular nutrition, nutrigenetics, and nutrigenomics at the University of Barcelona, and she has four books on the market that reflect her extensive knowledge in these areas, as well as lectures on nutrition and healthy eating.

Filmography

Movies

Television series

Television programs

Bibliography 

 Yo sí que como (2013)
 Yo sí que cocino (2015)
 Yo sí que me cuido (2016)

References

External links 
 Patricia Pérez on IMDb

Spanish game show hosts
Spanish film actors
Spanish television actresses
Spanish television presenters
Living people
1973 births